Love (German: Liebe) is a 1927 German silent film directed by Paul Czinner and starring Elisabeth Bergner, Agnes Esterhazy and Elza Temary.

Cast
 Elisabeth Bergner as Herzogin von Langeais  
 Agnes Esterhazy as Gräfin Serezy  
 Elza Temary as Gräfin Fontaine  
 Olga Engl as Die alte Prinzessin  
 Else Heller as Äbtissin  
 Hans Rehmann as Marquis von Montriveau  
 Paul Otto as Marquis von Ronquerolles  
 Nicolai Wassiljeff as Der junge Prinz  
 Arthur Kraußneck as Vitzdom von Pamier  
 Leopold von Ledebur as Herzog von Navarra  
 Jaro Fürth as Herzog von Grandlieu  
 Hans Conrady as Ein Mönch  
 Karl Platen as Diener

References

Bibliography
 Eisner, Lotte H. The Haunted Screen: Expressionism in the German Cinema and the Influence of Max Reinhardt. University of California Press, 2008.

External links

1927 films
Films of the Weimar Republic
Films directed by Paul Czinner
German silent feature films
Films based on works by Honoré de Balzac
Films set in the 19th century
1920s historical films
German historical films
German black-and-white films
Phoebus Film films
1920s German films